Rajka is a village in Győr-Moson-Sopron County, Hungary. The village has large Slovak and  German minorities.

Etymology
The name comes from the Slavic personal name Rajko, Rajka (derived from rajь: paradise). 1297 Royka.

Geography
M15 motorway (E65/E75), Highway 150, and the Budapest–Hegyeshalom–Rajka railway line all cross the village. The Hungarian-Slovak border crossing between Rajka and Čunovo was lifted on 21 December 2007, when Hungary and Slovakia acceded to the Schengen Area.

History
Rajka was established before the 13th century. According to the Hungarian Royal Treasury (Magyar Királyi Kincstár) it was an ethnic German settlement in Hungary, called Rackendorf in 1495. In the 18th century it was a market town (mezőváros) in Moson County. The Jewish community was forcibly deported in 1944. After the Soviet occupation of Hungary in 1946, 859 German civilians were expelled from Rajka. They were replaced by ethnic Hungarians expelled from Czechoslovakia.

Population
Mayor Vince Kiss spoke in 2012 of 1,000 Slovak citizens living in Rajka and making up one-third of the population. Most of these are ethnic Slovaks, but a significant proportion are ethnic Hungarian citizens of Slovakia or conversant with the Hungarian language. These Slovak citizens form a fragmented, dormitory community of people working or studying in Bratislava, the Slovak capital, and commuting there every day.

According to the 2011 census, however, the population of Rajka was 2,758, of whom 1,938 (70.3%) declared themselves Hungarians, 535 (19.4%) Slovaks and 284 (10.3%) Germans by ethnicity.

Gallery

References

External links 
 Street map 

Populated places in Győr-Moson-Sopron County
Hungary–Slovakia border crossings
Hungarian German communities